Sharon Marcia Blyfield  is a British marketing executive and human resources expert. She has championed early career development at The Coca-Cola Company. She was appointed an Officer of the Order of the British Empire (OBE) in 2022.

Early life and education 
Blyfield is from West London. She has two brothers. She attended Burlington Danes Academy a voluntary aided school, and was determined to get a job that would mean her mother did not have to worry about money. She completed a BTEC Extended Diploma in business and finance whilst studying at Hammersmith and West London College. After completing her course, she was offered a job in financial administration.

Career 
Blyfield worked in advertising, holding positions at Cadbury and The Coca-Cola Company. At the time, Coca-Cola was expanding into the UK economy, and Blyfield was involved with scaling up their advertising programmes. She eventually shifted to human resources, with a particular focus on the development of early career employees. 

Under Blyfield's leadership, Coca-Cola expanded their apprenticeship scheme to include engineering, sales and administration. To improve access to the scheme; she modified the GCSE requirements, and removed the requirement for a CV. She has developed mentorship and training programmes to support apprentices throughout their careers.

Blyfield has campaigned to make apprenticeships more commonplace in the UK. She has also spoken about the need to increase the salaries of apprentices. In 2023, Blyfield was appointed Director of the Board of Youth Employment UK.

Awards and honours
Blyfield was appointed an Officer of the Order of the British Empire in the 2022 New Year Honours.

References 

Living people
People from London
Coca-Cola people
Year of birth missing (living people)
British marketing people
20th-century British businesswomen
20th-century British businesspeople
21st-century British businesswomen
21st-century British businesspeople
Black British businesspeople
Black British women
Officers of the Order of the British Empire